Hubert Palmer Yockey (April 15, 1916 – January 31, 2016) was an American physicist and information theorist. He worked under Robert Oppenheimer on the Manhattan Project, and at the University of California, Berkeley.

Yockey attended the University of California, Berkeley where he was awarded a bachelors in 1938 and a Ph.D. in 1942. In 1946 he married Mary Ann Leach.

He studied the application of information theory to problems in biology and published his conclusions in the Journal of Theoretical Biology from 1974 onwards. Yockey was very critical of the primordial soup theory of the origin of life, and believed that "the origin of life is unsolvable as a scientific problem".

His wife Mary died in 2006. Yockey died on January 31, 2016, at the age of 99.

Publications

Hubert P. Yockey Information Theory and Molecular Biology 1992 Cambridge University Press, 
Hubert P. Yockey, Information Theory, Evolution, and the Origin of Life 2005 Cambridge University Press,

See also
Mathematical and theoretical biology
Systems biology
Entropy and life

References

External links
Hubert Yockey's website (dormant)

1916 births
2016 deaths
American physicists
Fellows of the American Physical Society
Manhattan Project people